Jambaladinni near Sirwar is a village in the Manvi taluk of Raichur district in the Indian state of Karnataka. Jambaladiini is located northwest to Manvi town. Jambaladinni is 10 km from Sirwar, 14 km Manvi and 45 km from Raichur

Demographics
As of 2001 India census, Jambaladinni had a population of 1,458 with 709 males and 749 females and 282 Households.

Importance
Jambaladiini is the birthplace of the great Vachana exponent Sri Pandit Siddarama Jambaladinni.
Paddy, Javar, Sunflower, Cotton are the primary crops farmers grow in this village. Lands are irrigated through the channels from Tungabadra left bank canal.

It has ancient Hanuman temple at the center of village. It has educated young people like lawyers, engineers, and doctors.

See also
Devadurga
Lingasugur
Manvi
Raichur

References

External links
www.raichur.nic.in

Villages in Raichur district